ULMA Architectural Solutions is a cooperative in the construction sector that creates prefabricated products for drainage and architecture. In the field of architecture it offers: ventilated facades, industrialized enclosures, customized prefabricated products and urban furniture. It is one of the 9 cooperative companies that make up ULMA, one of the largest business groups in northern Spain.

History
ULMA Architectural Solutions is one of the 9 companies which make up ULMA cooperative group, which dates back to 1957 when six young mechanics set up a small workshop in Oñate (Guipúzcoa) to offer ancillary services to the chocolate industry in the region. In 1961, they formed the Industrial Cooperative Talleres ULMA S.C.I., the name of which is an acronym of their surnames, following the example of the founders of Fagor Electrodomésticos.

Although their first business was based on chocolate packaging machines (which led to the company now known as ULMA Packaging), in 1963 they patented the first JJEIP prefabricated scaffolding in Spain, which was their introduction to the construction business. As their business grew with products such as construction flanges and forklift trucks, the different businesses adopted a new, unique corporate image which took shape in the 1990s.

In 1990 ULMA Group decided to launch a new business called ULMA Polymer Concrete, dedicated to the manufacture of prefabricated polymer concrete drainage channels and window sills, as part of ULMA Construction. In 1991, the new business set up its premises and began to manufacture the first prefabricated pieces of polymer concrete, a material hitherto unknown in Spain. Indeed, it was so unknown that it was not sure how to translate "polymer concrete" into Spanish, and ended up calling it "mineral colado".

In 1996, the company left ULMA Construction and set up as a business under the name ULMA Polymer Concrete. In 1997 it consolidated its own sales network and, in 2001, started to manufacture and market ventilated facades, which supplemented its existing products such as architectural prefabricates. Its headquarters, covering 12,000 sqm. in the Zubillaga district in Oñati, opened in 2001.

Economic data
 
In 2023 ULMA Architectural Solutions has 250 employees. It forms part of ULMA Group, is present in 80 countries with a workforce of 5,500 people and turns over 1000 million euros. The other businesses in the group are  ULMA Construction, ULMA Forklift Trucks, ULMA Conveyor Components, ULMA Embebbed Solutions, ULMA Handling Systems, ULMA Packaging and ULMA Forged Solutions.

Products

ULMA Architectural Solutions manufactures four types of products all in polymer concrete: 

 Canalization and drainage: solutions for fluid canalization and surface collection of rainwater, as well as for the conduction of facilities and services. Linear drainage, electrical conduits and beaconing.
 Architectural prefabricated products: flashings, copings, jambs, baseboards and customized solutions.
 Facade enclosures: self-supporting multilayer enclosure system that solves the complete envelope with the thermal and acoustic insulation required in each case.
 Ventilated facades: a system for cladding building walls that leaves a ventilated chamber between the cladding and the insulation, eliminating thermal bridges and condensation problems to obtain better thermal-hygrometric results and greater savings in energy consumption. It eliminates direct radiation or inclement weather on walls and slabs, protecting them from the pathologies that affect buildings constructed with traditional systems.
 Urban furniture: urban benches, lighting fixtures and designer planters.

All these products are made of polymer concrete, a material composed of a combination of silica and quartz aggregates, bound by stable polyester resins. It is up to four times more resistant to compression than traditional concrete, allowing the production of lightweight elements - pieces with a thinner profile that allow the use of auxiliary means of transport to the construction site - and of reduced dimensions.

International market 
Since 2009, ULMA Architectural Solutions has implemented an internationalization policy and has opened subsidiaries in Portugal, France, Brazil, Germany, the United Kingdom, Italy and the United States. It has a presence through distributors in more than 20 countries around the world.

Certificates and awards

 Drainage channels: ULMA's channels are developed and certified in accordance with Standard UNE EN 1433.
 Ventilated facades DIT 476R/10 Certificate in Ventilated Facades. The Eduardo Torroja Institute of Construction Science awards the Technical Suitability Document to ULMA Ventilated Facades Coating System with Polymer Concrete panels. The System also complies with the Technical Building Code.
 Architectural prefabricates: All architectural prefabricates count on EN 14617 quality certificates by Aenor and are certified by Tecnalia. 
 Enclosure walls: The facade External Wall system based on "Light gauge steel framing" have been classified by the Certification Body Breeam (Building Research Establishment Environmental Assessment Methodology) as category A and A+.

ULMA is a member of the Board of Directors of Eraikune, the Construction Hub. It has been awarded, amongst others, the Premio NAN Architecture and Construction prize for the best materials in 2010 and 2014, and in 2015 it received one of the four Diplomas of the Construmat Awards for Technological Innovation.

Projects

 Ventilated facades in residential buildings such as the BBK care home in Bilbao or apartment blocks in Cornellá (Barcelona), as well as others dedicated to leisure and culture, such as the Image and Sound Museum of Rio de Janeiro and Portoseguro Theatre in São Paulo, Brazil. 
 Energetic refurbishment of residential buildings in Cornellá (Barcelona) with ventilated facades.
 Drainage channels in Arese shopping centre in Milan (1100 linear metres of channels throughout the surface of the underground car park); in Campofrío's 50,000 sqm. plant for the production of frozen pizzas in Ólvega (Soria); in the entrances to the Camp Nou; in the Guggenheim Museum in Bilbao and in Madrid Barajas, Malaga and São Paulo Guarulhos airports, amongst others.
 Refurbishment of terraces with prefabricated stone finish in residential buildings in Barcelona.

Since 2016 ULMA Architectural Solutions has also offered solutions for indoor coatings with different textures, colours, finishes and formats.

Corporate social responsibility
ULMA Architectural Solutions has signed up to the 10 Principles of the Global Compact deriving from declarations of the United Nations with regards to human rights, labour, the environment and anti-corruption. In 2010, ULMA helped to set up the ULMA Foundation, through which it gives 10% of its profits to different projects of public interest related to welfare, sport, society and culture.

In 2010, ULMA helped create the ULMA Foundation, to allocate 10% of its profits to welfare, sports or socio-cultural projects of public interest. Since 2010, the ULMA Foundation has supported dozens of projects with a social purpose, such as sheltering children from Chernobyl (Banoia Txernobilekin Association), development cooperation projects in Nicaragua (AMS Association) or support for disabled children in Bogota (Kainabera Solidarity). The foundation has also collaborated with NGOs and associations of a welfare nature such as Gautena (Guipuzcoa Autism Association), Aspace (Confederation of Cerebral Palsy Care Associations) or Ademgi (Multiple Sclerosis Association of Guipuzcoa); and with others in the field of education, the Basque language and culture linked to its geographical environment (Oñate Children's School, Arizmendi Ikastola or Mondragon Unibertsitatea, among others).

References

External links 
 Official site

Building materials companies
Manufacturing companies of Spain
Basque companies
1990 establishments in the Basque Country (autonomous community)
Mondragon Corporation
Gipuzkoa